The 1937–38 season was the 41st in the history of the Western Football League.

The Division One champions for the fifth time in their history were Bristol City Reserves. The winners of Division Two for the second consecutive season were Weymouth. There was again no promotion or relegation between the two divisions this season.

Division One
Division One remained at five clubs, with no clubs leaving or joining.

Division Two
Division Two remained at eighteen clubs after Swindon Town Reserves left and one new club joined:

Bath City Reserves, rejoining after leaving the league in 1936.

References

1937-38
4